Himacerus mirmicoides, common name ant damsel bug, is a species of damsel bugs belonging to the family Nabidae, subfamily Nabinae.

Etymology
The name “mirmicoides” comes from the similarity of nymphs in the early instars to ants.

Distribution
These bugs can be found in most of Europe.

Habitat

These bugs can be found on the ground, in low herbage and in dry open areas.

Description
These bugs have a brown body with a black connexivum showing orange-red spots. They are partly-winged, with quite reddish wings.

This species is rather similar to Himacerus apterus, but it is smaller, with shorter antennae and longer wings. Moreover the hairs on the hind tibiae are shorter.

The nymphs resemble ants and the appearance of a typical hymenopteran "waist" is created by the paler coloration of the back of the thorax, contrasting with the rest of the body which is mainly black.

Biology
Adults can be found all year around. Mating and egg-laying begins in spring with the new generation occurring in August.

References

Further reading
 Kerzhner I.M., 1996 – Family Nabidae – Catalogue of the Heteroptera of the Palaearctic Region

External links
 Picture story about the biology and behaviour of Ant Damsel Bug Himacerus mirmicoides 
 Biolib

Insects described in 1834
Hemiptera of Europe
Nabidae
Taxa named by Oronzio Gabriele Costa